Under the Mental Health Act 2007, the role of approved social worker has been abolished and replaced by that of Approved Mental Health Professional in England and Wales.

Approved social workers were mental health social workers trained to enact elements of the Mental Health Act 1983. They received specific training relating to the Mental Health Act 1983, usually lasting one year, and performed a pivotal role in the assessment and detention process of people with mental illness.

References

External links 
 Suffolk County Mental Health Page

Social care in the United Kingdom